The Goio-Erê Formation is a geological formation in Brazil. It is sometimes thought to be deposited between the Turonian and Campanian stages of the Late Cretaceous, but an Aptian-Albian date has also been proposed. It primarily consists of sandstone and was deposited in a desert environment. It is known for its exceptional 3-D preservation of fossils, which include those of the pterosaurs Keresdrakon and Caiuajara, the dinosaur Berthasaura as well as the iguanian lizard Gueragama. It is laterally equivalent to the Rio Paraná Formation.

References 

Geologic formations of Brazil
Upper Cretaceous Series of South America
Cretaceous Brazil
Campanian Stage
Coniacian Stage
Santonian Stage
Turonian Stage
Sandstone formations
Fossiliferous stratigraphic units of South America
Paleontology in Brazil
Paraná Basin